The Kalinga–Cagayan Road or Tabuk–Enrile Road, is a  major road that connects the city of Tabuk in Kalinga to the municipality of Enrile in Cagayan.

The entire road is designated as National Route 52 (N52) of the Philippine highway network.

Route description

Intersections

References 

Roads in Cagayan
Roads in Kalinga (province)
Roads in Isabela (province)